Saqi (also Romanized as Sāqī; also known as Sāgī) is a village in Alqurat Rural District, in the Central District of Birjand County, South Khorasan Province, Iran. At the 2006 census, its population was 310, in 118 families.

References 

Populated places in Birjand County